The Nieterana Power Station is a small hydroelectric power station located in the Central Highlands region of Tasmania, Australia.

Technical details
Part of the Derwent scheme that comprises eleven hydroelectric power stations, the Nieterana Power Station is the second station in the scheme. The power station is located aboveground at the foot of the concrete arched Clark Dam across the River Derwent that forms Lake King William. Water from the lake is fed to the Butlers Gorge Power Station, coupled to one of two discharge regulating valves to ensure water flow to
Tarraleah Power Station located further downstream. The Nieterana Power Station takes advantage of the energy potential from water dissipating from the Butlers Gorge Power Station into Tarraleah No. 2 canal.

The station output is fed to TasNetworks' transmission grid via an existing 11 kV/110 kV three-phase English Electric generator transformer to the outdoor switchyard.

Nieterana is the aboriginal word for little brother.

See also 

List of power stations in Tasmania

References

Energy infrastructure completed in 2004
Central Highlands (Tasmania)
Hydroelectric power stations in Tasmania